This is a list of properties and districts in Dade County, Georgia that are listed on the National Register of Historic Places (NRHP).

Current listings

|}

References

Dade
Buildings and structures in Dade County, Georgia